Korem 132/Tadulako or Military Area Command 132nd/Tadulako is a Military Area Command (Korem) under Kodam XIII/Merdeka. Its garrison located on city of Palu, Central Sulawesi. It consists of five military district commands (Kodim) and one light infantry battalion attached located in Poso. The formation is involved in various insurgencies against Islamic extremist insurgency in the region, most recently against East Indonesia Mujahideen in Poso Regency.

Units 
 Kodim 1305/Buol-Tolitoli
 Kodim 1306/Donggala
 Kodim 1307/Poso
 Kodim 1308/Luwuk-Banggai
 Kodim 1311/Morowali
 714th Infantry Battalion/Sintuwu Maroso

References 

Indonesian Army
Military regional commands of Indonesia